S. Ashwath Narayan Rao Ramadas is an Indian politician. He is a member of the Bharatiya Janata Party (BJP).

He is a Member of the Legislative Assembly (India) from Krishnaraja constituency in Mysore, Karnataka. In the 2008 Karnataka assembly elections, he contested against Congress leader M. K. Somashekar, a former MLA and won by a margin of about 20000 votes. He is considered one of the main Hindu leaders of Mysore. He has been elected from this constituency on two earlier occasions in 1994 and 1999 but lost to M. K. Somashekar in 2004.

Following the historic victory of the BJP in Karnataka in May 2008, he was appointed Parliamentary Secretary to the Chief Minister B. S. Yeddyurappa. In 2010, he was appointed a Cabinet minister in the Yeddyurappa government and entrusted with the Medical Education portfolio. He continued in the same post in the D.V. Sadananda Gowda government. He was also the district in-charge minister for Mysore district in the 2008 - 2013 assembly. In 2013, he contested from Krishnaraja constituency and was defeated by M. K. Somashekar of INC.

Ramdas heads a voluntary organisation called Aasare Foundation which is into social service in Mysore.

References

External links
S. A. Ramadas affidavit

Bharatiya Janata Party politicians from Karnataka
Living people
Kannada people
Politicians from Mysore
State cabinet ministers of Karnataka
Karnataka MLAs 2018–2023
1959 births